Marsh Township is one of fifteen townships in Surry County, North Carolina, United States. The township had a population of 2,499 according to the 2000 census.

Geographically, Marsh Township occupies  in southern Surry County, with its southern border consisting of the Yadkin River.  There are no incorporated municipalities within Marsh Township; however, there are several smaller, unincorporated communities located here, including Burch, Crutchfield, Fairview and Little Richmond.

Townships in Surry County, North Carolina
Townships in North Carolina